Phegley is a surname. Notable people with the surname include:

Josh Phegley (born 1988), American baseball catcher
Roger Phegley (born 1956), American basketball player